Young Siward is a character in William Shakespeare’s play Macbeth (1606). He is the son of Siward, general of the English forces in the battle against Macbeth. Macbeth kills him in the final battle, shortly before his swordfight with Lord Macduff.

He is based on the real-life historical figure of Osbeorn Bulax.

Role in the Play
He first appears in scene 5.2, as the English forces join with the Scottish. Lennox refers to him as one of many “unrough youths” who “protest their first of manhood.” If he is an “unrough” youth, then he is too young to grow a beard and is probably around fifteen or sixteen. Also, to protest “his first of manhood” means that he is eager to prove himself as a man.

He next appears in scenes 5.4 and 5.6 as the troops enter Birnam Wood and Malcolm orders him and his father to lead the first battalion against Macbeth.

His final appearance occurs in scene 5.7 when he comes across Macbeth and attacks, calling him “an abhorred tyrant.” Macbeth slays him and exits the stage.

In the final scene of the play, Ross informs Siward of his son’s death, saying “like a man he died.” Siward expresses his gratitude that his son died honorably, and says he is sure that his son has become a soldier of God.

Significance
In his article about the death of Young Siward, Karl F. Zender writes:

In this sense, the battle between Macbeth and Young Siward serves two purposes. Young Siward is offering himself as champion of Christian good against the forces of darkness, and for Macbeth, his triumph over the boy is proof of his (mistaken) belief that no human can kill him. Young Siward's Christian beliefs are echoed when his father hears of his death and is assured that his son has become "God’s soldier" because of his battle against evil. Although he falls in battle, Young Siward is praised for his bravery, and in falling at the hand of Macbeth he has finally achieved manhood (this is indicated when Ross informs Siward that his son "only liv'd but till he was a man").

However the Young Siward does show blatant cracks in the character of Malcolme -
- when Malcolme was confronted by 'Norweyans' he ran while others fought against his captivity (The Tragedy of Macbeth I.ii).
- if run down by the 'Norweyans', his hurts would have been on the back. God's Soldiers only have their hurts on the front (The Tragedy of Macbeth V.viii).
- Young Siward, with his uncle, leads the first assault while Malcolme remains (The Tragedy of Macbeth V.vi).

Shakespeare alludes to the cowardice of Malcolme in the following words

"You (worthy Uncle)
Shall with my Cousin your right Noble Son
Lead our first Battle." (The Tragedy of Macbeth V.vi 3-5)

References 

Characters in Macbeth
Literary characters introduced in 1603
Fictional nobility
Fictional soldiers
Male Shakespearean characters